Uvarov and Uvarova (feminine) is an old Russian surname of counts and noble families of the Russian Empire. Notable people with the surname include:

 Aleksandr Uvarov (ice hockey) (1922–1994), Soviet ice hockey player
 Aleksandr Uvarov (footballer) (b. 1960), Soviet and Israeli footballer
 Aleksey Uvarov (Count Aleksey Sergeyevich Uvarov) (1825–1884), Russian archaeologist
 Boris Uvarov (1889–1970), Russian-British entomologist
 Olga Uvarov (Dame Olga Nikolaevna Uvarov) (1910–2001), the first woman president of the Royal College of Veterinary Surgeons
 Sergey Uvarov (Count Sergey Semionovich Uvarov) (1786–1855), Russian classical scholar and statesman
 V. Uvarov, Soviet set decorator

Russian-language surnames